Copelatus irregularis is a species of diving beetle. It is part of the genus Copelatus in the subfamily Copelatinae of the family Dytiscidae. It was described by W. J. Macleay in 1871.

References

irregularis
Beetles described in 1871